Season of Strangers (sometimes referred as haiku film) is 1959 unfinished American 16 mm black and white Avant-garde-experimental short film directed by Maya Deren.

Production
The film began as a part of Deren's workshop which took place in Woodstock, New York, during July 6 to July 25 in 1959. Deren after claimed that the location was important for the structure of the film. Also the lyrical aspect of Japanese Haiku motivated the fim as well.

References

External links

1950s unfinished films
1959 films
1950s avant-garde and experimental films
Experimental film
American black-and-white films
American silent short films
American avant-garde and experimental films
Films directed by Maya Deren
1950s American films